Maenclochog railway station served the village of Maenclochog, Pembrokeshire, Wales, from 1876 to 1949 on the Narberth Road and Maenclochog Railway.

History 
The station opened on 19 September 1876 by the Narberth Road and Maenclochog Railway. It was situated on the south side of an unnamed minor road on the C3002. The goods yard originally had four sidings, the easternmost one serving a cattle dock and its pens. The signal box was adjacent to the level crossing. The station closed and reopened a lot, first closing on 1 January 1883, reopening in December 1884, closing again on 31 March 1885, reopening again on 21 March 1887, closing yet again on 25 May 1887, reopening yet again on 11 April 1895 when the line was extended closing on 8 January 1917 and reopening one last time on 12 July 1920. After it reopened in 1895, it was remodelled dramatically, receiving a second platform, a new station building and the signal box was relocated south of its original position. The goods yard was also relocated and the number of sidings was reduced to three. The signal box was closed and demolished after the line reopened in 1920. The station closed permanently to passengers on 25 October 1937 and closed to goods on 16 May 1949.

References

External links 

Disused railway stations in Pembrokeshire
Railway stations in Great Britain opened in 1878
Railway stations in Great Britain closed in 1883
Railway stations in Great Britain opened in 1884
Railway stations in Great Britain closed in 1885
Railway stations in Great Britain opened in 1887
Railway stations in Great Britain closed in 1887
Railway stations in Great Britain opened in 1895
Railway stations in Great Britain closed in 1917
Railway stations in Great Britain opened in 1920
Railway stations in Great Britain closed in 1937
1878 establishments in Wales
Former Great Western Railway stations